Stomphastis thraustica is a moth of the family Gracillariidae. It is known from Democratic Republic of Congo, Congo, Central African Republic, Ghana, Nigeria, Namibia, Zimbabwe, South Africa, Madagascar, Malaysia, Indonesia (Sulawesi, Java) and India (West Bengal, Karnataka). It was recently also recorded from China.

In China, there are over ten overlapping generations per year.

The larvae feed on Jatropha species (including Jatropha curcas and Jatropha gossypifolia) and Sebastiana chamaelea. They mine the leaves of their host plant. The mine has the form of an irregular blotch mine, often several on one leaf.

References

Stomphastis
Insects of the Central African Republic
Lepidoptera of the Democratic Republic of the Congo
Moths of Madagascar
Lepidoptera of Mozambique
Lepidoptera of Namibia
Lepidoptera of the Republic of the Congo
Lepidoptera of West Africa
Lepidoptera of Zimbabwe
Moths of Asia
Moths of Sub-Saharan Africa